843 Nicolaia is a main-belt asteroid discovered by Danish astronomer H. Thiele on 30 September 1916. It was a lost asteroid for 65 years before being rediscovered by Astronomisches Rechen-Institut at Heidelberg in 1981. The asteroid is orbiting the Sun with a period of 3.44 years.

References

External links 
 
 

000843
Discoveries by Holger Thiele
Named minor planets
19160930